Juilee Pryor is a street artist and an abstract artist from Sydney, Australia.

Pryor is most well known for her large-scale mural artwork in Sydney and its inner-suburbs.  She has been an active artist since 1982, her most recent work being in 2015 with a set of prints called "happy birthday fat grrl #1 - 3."

Pryor now lives in Austinmer, New South Wales.

Notable achievements 
 I Have a Dream Mural 
 How the light gets in (Master of Visual Arts) 
 Member of the Unmitigated Audacity Productions artists' collective

See also
 Newtown area graffiti and street art, a significant work area for Pryor

References 

 https://www.smh.com.au/entertainment/art-and-design/kings-street-20110825-1jbi4.html
 http://www.abs.gov.au/websitedbs/censushome.nsf/home/nsw-119?opendocument&navpos=620
 https://www.dailytelegraph.com.au/newslocal/inner-west/i-have-a-dream-mural-on-king-st-newtown-to-be-heritage-listed-by-marrickville-council/news-story/3d0b61d1014cf224c640d075824396c9
 https://daaouat.library.unsw.edu.au/bio/juilee-pryor/biography/
 https://www.trybooking.com/book/event?eid=42389
 https://www.domain.com.au/news/a-guide-to-the-inner-wests-best-murals-20180808-h13onv-756952/
 https://www.domain.com.au/news/councils-brush-up-their-views-on-preserving-heritagelisted-street-art-20120813-243n3/

Living people
Australian muralists
Year of birth missing (living people)